Ann-Iren Mørkved (married Skevik, born 7 August 1981) is a Norwegian football defender. She played for Trondheims-Ørn and the Norwegian national team.

She retired from first-tier football in 2014.

References

External links 
 

1981 births
Living people
Sportspeople from Bodø
Norwegian women's footballers
Norway women's youth international footballers
Norway women's international footballers
IK Grand Bodø players
Athene Moss players
SK Trondheims-Ørn players
IF Fløya players
Kattem IL players
Ranheim Fotball players
Women's association football defenders